Precipice is a national park in Queensland, Australia, 377 km northwest of Brisbane.

See also

 Protected areas of Queensland

References 

National parks of Far North Queensland
Protected areas established in 1989